Province 3 (III), also known as the Province of Washington, is one of nine ecclesiastical provinces making up the Episcopal Church in the United States of America. It comprises thirteen dioceses in the Middle Atlantic States of Delaware, Maryland, Pennsylvania, Virginia, West Virginia, as well as Washington, D.C. Bishop Mike Klusmeyer of the Diocese of West Virginia serves as President.

Dioceses of Province III

Diocese of Bethlehem
Diocese of Central Pennsylvania
Diocese of Delaware
Diocese of Easton
Diocese of Maryland
Diocese of Northwestern Pennsylvania
Diocese of Pennsylvania
Diocese of Pittsburgh
Diocese of Southern Virginia
Diocese of Southwestern Virginia
Diocese of Virginia
Diocese of Washington
Diocese of West Virginia

References and external links 
ECUSA Province Directory
Province III website

Province 3